Lateral violence is displaced violence; that is anger and rage is directed towards members within a marginalised or oppressed community rather than towards the oppressors of the community – one's peers rather than adversaries. Developed by scholars within the global indigenous first people's community, this construct is one way of explaining minority-on-minority violence occurring within marginalized and oppressed communities.  It is a cycle of abuse and its roots lie in factors such as: colonisation, oppression, intergenerational trauma and the ongoing experiences of racism and discrimination. Those experiencing and those committing lateral violence more likely to be involved in crime in the United States, the United Kingdom, and elsewhere.  In Australia and Canada, lateral violence is widely seen as an intergenerational learned pattern and major social problem in indigenous communities. In Australia surveys have reported that up to 95% of Aboriginal youth had witnessed lateral violence in the home, and that 95% of the bullying experienced by Aboriginals was perpetrated by other Aboriginals.

Near-synonyms include horizontal violence, intra-racial conflict, and internalized colonialism

The Government of Canada commissioned a study in 2008 by the Minister of Health, it reported that although there were root causes such as the residential school system and loss of culture in Aboriginals which could lead to increases in propensities towards domestic abuse and violence, the aggravation factor in an overwhelming number of the cases involved drugs or alcohol.

Outside the racial context, the term is also used in explanation of workplace bullying, though in that case the circumstances are much different. Some consider this an inappropriate definition.

Example
An example of inter-generational trauma would be the Corey and Cody Manyshots case involving two Aboriginal youth kidnapping and sexually assaulting a teen. The father of the teens was involved in animal cruelty cases involving a Bichon Frise and elastic bands. Furthermore, the father threatened to attack reporters at his sons' trials. Corey Manyshots was on bail for defacing the Dashmesh Cultural Centre, a Sikh temple in Calgary. This interpretation through an intergenerational trauma perspective would understand that both Corey and Cody Manyshots were the subject of collective trauma from the colonial injustices passed down from generation to generation and have less of a responsibility for criminal acts and reprehensible behaviours. This interpretation is considered flawed by some and perpetuates violence among Aboriginals.

References

Social concepts
Violence against Indigenous people in Canada
Bullying
Violence